Tahiti 80 are a French indie pop band from Rouen. The group was founded in 1992 by Xavier Boyer, Pedro Resende, Médéric Gontier and Sylvain Marchand.

History

Singer and guitarist Boyer and bassist Resende formed the pop combo as students at the University of Rouen. Taking their name from a souvenir t-shirt given to Boyer's father in 1980, the duo recruited guitarist Mederic Gontier, and with the addition of drummer Sylvain Marchand a year later, the lineup was complete. The foursome released a self-produced and self-financed EP, "20 Minutes" which resulted in them signing a deal with French label Atmospheriques.

In 1998, the band flew to New York City to record their first album Puzzle with Andy Chase. Featuring contributions from Eric Matthews and Adam Schlesinger, Puzzle was mixed in Sweden by Tore Johansson. Puzzle received a gold certification from the RIAJ in December 2000. Tahiti 80's U.S. label, Minty Fresh, released a mini LP called Extra Pieces, which included B-sides, remixes and other rarities.

In 2001, the band re-united with Andy Chase to record a more experimental follow up album, Wallpaper for the Soul. The sessions took place in Rouen, New York City, Étretat, London. and Portland, Oregon. The album was mixed by Tony Lash and arranged by Richard Anthony Hewson. Wallpaper for the Soul was released in 2002, garnered positive reviews.

Following that, Xavier Boyer selected songs for a compilation called "A Piece of Gold" on behalf of the band. Featuring Todd Rundgren, Small Faces, and Donald Byrd, it was only released in Japan.

For their third album, from 2003–2004, Tahiti 80 spent several months at their own recording studio, the Tahitilab. The songs were mostly improvised and written in the studio, and collaborated with Neal Pogue and Serban Ghenea. British singer Linda Lewis also appeared as a guest artist on "Your Love Shines". "Better Days Will Come" was featured in the first episode of the fourth season of Smallville in September, 2004.

In 2007, the band transferred to Barclay and in 2008, they returned to the Tahitilab to record Activity Center. It was described by critics as a back to basics album, with a rawer sound and a rock production style. Drums were subsequently played by Julien Barbagallo with percussion by Raphael Leger.

During winter and early spring 2010, Tahiti 80 recorded their fifth album, The Past, The Present & The Possible. The album was released in early 2011. In 2012, Barbagallo left Tahiti 80 to join Tame Impala, with multi-instrumentalist Hadrien Grange of Parisian pop group Dorian Pimpernel replacing him. In 2014, Tahiti 80 released Ballroom, their sixth album which was co-produced by Richard Swift.

Line-up
 Xavier Boyer: vocals, guitars, bass, keyboards, piano
 Médéric Gontier: guitar, vocals, keyboards
 Sylvain Marchand: drums, percussion, keyboards, piano
 Pedro Resende: bass, programming, keyboards, percussion, vocals
 Raphaël Léger: drums, percussion, Keyboards, vocals
 Hadrien Grange: keyboards, percussion, vocals (2012-present)

Past members
 Julien Barbagallo: drums, percussion, keyboards, vocals (2008-2012)

Discography

Albums
1999 Puzzle
2002 Wallpaper for the Soul
2005 Fosbury
2008 Activity Center
2011 The Past, the Present & the Possible
2014 Ballroom
2018 The Sunshine Beat Vol. 1
2022 Here With You

EPs

1996 20 Minutes
2000 Heartbeat Remix
2001 Extra Pieces
2001 I.S.A.A.C
2001 Songs From Outer Space
2003 A Piece of Sunshine
2004 Extra Pieces of Sunshine
2005 Sotomayor EP
2008 Joulupukki
2010 Solitary Bizness
2013 Bang
2016 ... And the Rest Is Just Crocodile Tears

Singles

1999 "Heartbeat"
2000 "Made First"
2000 "A Love From Outer Space"
2000 "Yellow Butterfly"
2002 "1000 Times"
2002 "Soul Deep"
2005 "Big Day" (featured on the FIFA 07 video game soundtrack)
2005 "Changes"
2005 "Here Comes"
2006 "Chinatown" (split single with Fugu)
2008 "All Around"
2009 "Unpredictable"
2011 "Darling (Adam & Eve)"
2011 "Easy"
2013 "Bang"
2014 "Crush!"
2014 "Missing"
2018 "Let Me Be Your Story"
2018 "Sound Museum"
2018 "My Groove"
2019 "Hurts"
2021 "Hot"
2022 "Lost In The Sound"

Compilations
2003 A Piece of Gold
2005 Unusual Sounds
2010 Singles Club
2019 Fear Of An Acoustic Planet

Other releases
2005 Changes (DVD)

References

External links 

 Official site of Tahiti 80
 Tahiti 80 MySpace page

French house music groups
French indie pop groups
French indie rock groups
Musical groups from Normandy
French synthpop groups
Island Records artists
Musical groups established in 1993
Musical quartets